Mariann Edgar Budde (born December 10, 1959) is the diocesan bishop of the Episcopal Diocese of Washington. She was consecrated as the ninth Bishop of Washington in the Washington National Cathedral on November 12, 2011.  Prior to her election as Washington's first female diocesan bishop, she served for 18 years as the rector of St. John's Episcopal Church in Minneapolis, Minnesota.

Budde completed her undergraduate work at the University of Rochester, earning a Bachelor of Arts degree in history magna cum laude in 1982. She received her Master of Divinity and Doctor of Ministry degrees from the Virginia Theological Seminary. In May 2012, she was also awarded an honorary Doctor of Divinity degree from the same seminary.

Budde is the author of Gathering up the Fragments: Preaching as Spiritual Practice. Her most recent book is titled Receiving Jesus: The Way of Love with a foreword written by Presiding Bishop Michael Curry.

In June 2020, amid the George Floyd protests in Washington, DC, Budde criticized the use of tear gas by police and National Guard troops to clear the grounds of St. John's Episcopal Church, Lafayette Square to allow President Donald Trump to pose for a photo op in front of St. John's Church, enabling its use "as a backdrop for a message antithetical to the teachings of Jesus." The Chief of the US Park Police later stated that it was smoke canisters, not tear gas; but his statement would appear to have been not correct, since multiple news organizations have reported that a form of tear gas was used.

See also
 List of Episcopal bishops of the United States
 List of bishops of the Episcopal Church in the United States of America

References

External links 
Profile on the Episcopal Diocese of Washington website

21st-century Anglican bishops in the United States
Episcopal bishops of Washington
Women Anglican bishops
University of Rochester alumni
Virginia Theological Seminary alumni
1959 births
Living people